Kane Shee-Gong Yee (born March 26, 1934) is a Chinese-American electrical engineer and mathematician. He is best known for introducing the finite-difference time-domain method (FDTD) in 1966. 

His research interests include numerical electromagnetics, fluid dynamics, continuum mechanics and numerical analysis of partial differential equations.

Biography
Yee was born on March 26, 1934 in Guangzhou, Republic of China. He received his B.S. and M.S. in electrical engineering from University of California, Berkeley in 1957 and 1958, respectively. He has completed his PhD in applied mathematics department at the same university under the supervision of Bernard Friedman in 1963; his dissertation involved the study of boundary value problems for Maxwell's equations. From 1959 to 1961, he was employed at Lockheed Missiles and Space Company, researching diffraction in electromagnetic waves. 

In 1966, Yee published a paper on the use of a finite difference staggered grids algorithm in the solution of Maxwell's equations. Yee was initially motivated by his self-studies in Fortran to develop the method. Appearing on IEEE Transactions on Antennas and Propagation, the article received little attention at the time of its release. The incorrect numerical stability conditions on Yee's paper were corrected by Dong-Hoa Lam in 1969 and Allen Taflove and Morris E. Brodwin in 1975. The method was subsequently renamed as finite-difference time-domain method in 1980. FDTD is also referred as Yee algorithm, with its specific discretized grid being known as Yee lattice or Yee cell.

Between 1966 and 1984, Yee became a professor of electrical engineering and mathematics at the University of Florida and later at Kansas State University. He became a consultant to Lawrence Livermore National Laboratory in 1966, working on microwave vulnerability problems at the same institute from 1984 to 1987. In 1987, he became a research scientist at Lockheed Palo Alto Research Lab, working on computational electromagnetics problems and retiring in 1996.

Selected publications

See also
 Computational electromagnetics
 Finite difference method
 Finite difference time-domain method
 Finite volume method

References

Living people
1934 births
20th-century American mathematicians
20th-century Chinese mathematicians
20th-century American engineers
20th-century Chinese engineers
People from Guangzhou
Republic of China (1912–1949) emigrants to the United States
Chinese electrical engineers
American electrical engineers
UC Berkeley College of Engineering alumni
Lockheed Missiles and Space Company people
Lawrence Livermore National Laboratory staff
University of Florida faculty
Kansas State University faculty
Electrical engineering academics
Microwave engineers